Eirenis persicus is a species of snake of the family Colubridae. It is commonly known as the dark-headed dwarf racer.

Geographic range
The snake is found in the Middle East. Eirenis persicus has a wide distribution range. They can be found in south-eastern Turkey, southern Armenia, eastern Iraq, Iran, south Turkmenistan and also in some parts of Afghanistan, Pakistan, and north-western India.

References 

Eirenis
Reptiles described in 1872
Reptiles of the Middle East